Johannelunds teologiska högskola or Johannelund School of Theology is a university college in Sweden. It is an independent college/theological seminary, founded in 1862 and located in Uppsala, Sweden. In addition to offering a three-year bachelor's degree in theology, the seminary offers a one or two-year master's degree in theology. Today there are circa 200 students at Johannelund, most of whom are preparing for ministry in either the Swedish Evangelical Mission or the Church of Sweden. In addition, there is a Bible school located on campus offering a one-year certificate in theology. In addition, there is an extensive course offering in areas such as Bible, pastoral counselling, leadership and charismatic theology.

The school is owned and run by the Lutheran Swedish Evangelical Mission (in Swedish: Evangeliska fosterlandsstiftelsen) and began its existence as a training institute for inland and overseas missionaries. For the last several decades, however, Sweden's own need for church leaders and clergy has been the school's primary focus. Most students enroll today with an eye to future ministry in Sweden, although a number of students also end up working internationally in a variety of mission agencies or pursue doctoral studies in theology.

The school has several internationally well-renowned scholars as affiliated researchers or professors, and publishes the peer-reviewed Nordic academic journal Theofilos in cooperation with NLA University College, Norway.

The school has exchange programmes with the following theological institutions:
Luther Seminary in Saint Paul, Minnesota, USA
Wycliffe Hall of Oxford University, England 
Ethiopian Graduate School of Theology in Addis Ababa, Ethiopia  
MF Norwegian School of Theology in Oslo, Norway

In 2018 Johannelund came under new leadership with Docent James Starr as president.

References

External links
Official website
Swedish Evangelical Mission

Buildings and structures in Uppsala
University colleges in Sweden
Lutheran seminaries
Seminaries and theological colleges in Sweden
Education in Uppsala
Educational institutions established in 1862
1862 establishments in Sweden
Lutheran universities and colleges in Europe